Awudome Senior High School (AWUSCO) is a second cycle institution located in Tsito in the Ho West District in the Volta Region of Ghana. The current headmaster of the school is Courage Meteku.

History 
The school was established as a community school in September 1963 by the Tsito Native Teachers Association with about 60 students. In 2010, the headmaster of the school was Mr. Cyprian K. Otti. In 2020, the headmaster of the school was Mr. Amu Emmanuel Komla. In 2021, the school took part in the National Science and Maths Quiz where they contested against Mawuli School, Hohoe E.P Senior High School and Three Town Senior High School. Currently, the school has a population of about 2,432 students.

Achievement 
In 2018, the school won the Volta Regional Science and Maths Quiz.

References 

High schools in Ghana
1963 establishments in Ghana
Education in Volta Region